The Mohegan–Pequot Bridge is a steel girder bridge in Montville and Preston, Connecticut that carries Route 2A over the Thames River. It was built in 1967 as a toll bridge, but the tolls were removed in 1980. The bridge is the northernmost crossing of the Thames River.

References 

Bridges over the Thames River (Connecticut)
Former toll bridges in Connecticut
Road bridges in Connecticut
Bridges in New London County, Connecticut